Huang Chih-hsiung (born 16 October 1976 in Taipei County (now New Taipei City), Taiwan) is a Taiwanese athlete. Representing the Republic of China (as Chinese Taipei) in the 2004 Summer Olympics, he won the silver medal at the Men's 68 kg Taekwondo event. At the 2000 Summer Olympics he won a bronze medal at the Men's 58 kg Taekwondo event.

Political careers

2004 legislative election
Huang was placed third on the Kuomintang's legislators-at-large candidate list for the December 2004 legislative election, just behind Legislative Speaker Wang Jing-pyng and Deputy Legislative Speaker Chiang Pin-kung, and he subsequently won a seat in the sixth Legislative Yuan.

2008 legislative election
He was subsequently re-elected in the January 2008 legislative election, earning a place in the seventh Legislative Yuan.

2016 legislative election

External links

 
 
 Huang Chih-hsiung's profile from Legislative Yuan

1976 births
Living people
Olympic bronze medalists for Taiwan
Olympic silver medalists for Taiwan
Olympic taekwondo practitioners of Taiwan
New Taipei Members of the Legislative Yuan
Taekwondo practitioners at the 2000 Summer Olympics
Taekwondo practitioners at the 2004 Summer Olympics
Party List Members of the Legislative Yuan
Kuomintang Members of the Legislative Yuan in Taiwan
Members of the 6th Legislative Yuan
Members of the 7th Legislative Yuan
Members of the 8th Legislative Yuan
Asian Games medalists in taekwondo
Olympic medalists in taekwondo
Taekwondo practitioners at the 1998 Asian Games
Taekwondo practitioners at the 2002 Asian Games
Medalists at the 2004 Summer Olympics
Medalists at the 2000 Summer Olympics
Asian Games gold medalists for Chinese Taipei
Medalists at the 2002 Asian Games
Taiwanese sportsperson-politicians
World Taekwondo Championships medalists
Taiwanese male taekwondo practitioners